Reminiscent TV Network or (R TV) in short was an attempt to bring the TV subscription idea to Asian programming on the Sky Digital platform.  The idea was to provide channels which would launch free to air initially, then once an audience had been gained, some of the channels would go pay TV. Six channels were launched eventually in year 2000 to 2001.
These two channels were proposed initially but never launched.
African Caribbean Entertainment
Raag TV - Music Channel

The Reminiscent TV network got into financial trouble long before the level of subscriptions made viable, and all the channels were pulled off air over a period of few weeks in early 2002.

List of Channels Launched

Anjuman TV - Urdu Language
Asia 1 TV - Hindi 
Cee (1) TV - Tamil
Gurjari TV - Gujarati
Lashkara TV - Punjabi
Sonali TV - Bengali

Television broadcasting companies of the United Kingdom
Television channels in the United Kingdom